was a Japanese film director and screenwriter who directed Japan's first sound film, The Neighbor's Wife and Mine, in 1931. His films are mostly associated with the shomin-geki (lit. "common people drama") genre. Among his most noted works are Where Chimneys Are Seen, An Inn at Osaka, Takekurabe and Yellow Crow.

Life
Gosho was born on January 24, 1902, in Kanda, Tokyo, to merchant Heisuke Gosho and his father's geisha mistress. At the age of five, after Heisuke's eldest son died, Gosho left his mother to be the successor to his father's wholesale business. He studied business at Keio University, graduating in 1923.

Through his father's close relation to film director Yasujirō Shimazu, Gosho was able to join the Shochiku film studios and worked as assistant director to Shimazu. In 1925, Gosho debuted as a director with the film Nantō no haru. His films of the 1920s are nowadays regarded as lost. 

Gosho's first notable success, and Japan's first feature length sound film, was the 1931 comedy The Neighbor's Wife and Mine about a writer distracted by a noisy next-door jazz band. Naming Ernst Lubitsch's The Marriage Circle and Charles Chaplin's A Woman of Paris as the greatest foreign influences, Gosho's work oscillated between comedy and drama, sometimes mixing the two, which earned his films the reputation of making the viewer "laugh and cry at the same time". Other Gosho trademarks were his fast editing style and his repeated relying on literary sources, such as the works of Yūzō Yamamoto and Ichiyō Higuchi. Together with Shirō Toyoda, Gosho was one of the first directors to adapt the works of the junbungaku ("pure literature") movement for the screen, which opposed "popular" literature in favour of "serious" literature and a more complex handling of its subjects. A prominent example is The Dancing Girl of Izu (1933), a successful adaptation of Yasunari Kawabata's story of the same name, about the unfulfilled love between a student and a young country woman. Of his 36 1930s films, only slightly more than a half-dozen are extant.

A firm believer in humanism, Gosho tried to reduce militarist content in his wartime films, and showed solidarity with dismissed co-workers during the Toho studios strike of 1948. In 1950 he started the independent production company Studio Eight together with Shirō Toyoda and other former studio employees. Studio Eight's first production was Gosho's 1951 drama Dispersed Clouds about an unhappy young woman from Tokyo finding fulfilment as assistant of a country doctor. His best-known works of this era are the social realist marriage drama Where Chimneys Are Seen (1953), which was shown in competition at the Berlin International Film Festival, and Yellow Crow (1957), the portrait of a troubled father-son-relationship, which received the Golden Globe Award for Best Foreign Language Film. Although his films grew darker in tone by the mid-1950s, evident in works like An Inn at Osaka, about a group of Osaka residents struggling with an unrestrained materialistic environment, he stayed true to his ideals of "tolerance, compromise and rationality".

Gosho was also one of the first major Japanese directors to work extensively for television as a writer. Due to the rapid changes in the film industry at the time, Gosho's work in the 1960s alternated mostly between melodrama and shomin-geki, sometimes not exceeding well-made commercial entertainment. Notable films of this era are Hunting Rifle (1961), based on Yasushi Inoue's novella about an adulterous couple, An Innocent Witch (1965), the account of a young prostitute falling victim to superstition, and Rebellion of Japan (1967), a love story set against the backdrop of the February 26 Incident. His last feature-length directorial effort was the puppet film Meiji haru aki (1968). 

Between 1964 and 1980, Gosho served as president of the Directors Guild of Japan. Although having repeatedly worked with internationally known actresses and actors like Kinuyo Tanaka, few of his films have been seen in the West. In 1989–1990, a retrospective of his work was held by the Japan Society and the Museum of Modern Art, New York.

Gosho also wrote haiku poems and served as director of the Japanese Haiku Art Association.

Selected filmography

References

Bibliography
 Nolletti, Arthur (2005). The Cinema of Gosho Heinosuke: Laughter through Tears. Bloomington: Indiana University Press.

External links
  
 

Japanese film directors
People from Tokyo
1902 births
1981 deaths